is the trust banking arm of the Mitsubishi UFJ Financial Group, a Japanese financial services group which is the largest in the world measured by assets. The bank is headquartered in Tokyo, Japan.

The merger of Mitsubishi Tokyo Financial Group and UFJ Holdings on October 1, 2005 was followed by the merger of their respective trust banking subsidiaries, The Mitsubishi Trust and Banking Corporation and UFJ Trust Bank, creating Mitsubishi UFJ Trust and Banking Corporation.   The bank's Investor Services group provides administration, asset servicing, banking and fund financing.  The bank has over 3.3 trillion USD assets and is one of the major institutional investors in global markets.

History
The Mitsubishi Trust and Banking Corporation was a Japanese trust bank and a subsidiary of the Mitsubishi Tokyo Financial Group.

On October 1, 2005, the company merged with UFJ Trust Bank to form Mitsubishi UFJ Trust and Banking Corporation.

Scholarship
The Mitsubishi UFJ Trust and Banking Corporation Scholarship Foundation was established in 1953. Since then, it has provided over 5000 scholarships to undergraduate and graduate Japanese and foreign students (as of 2011, approximately 90% have been Japanese and 10% have been foreign). Applicants are nominated by their respective universities and generally study the social sciences.

Shareholders
Mitsubishi UFJ Financial Group (100%)

References

External links
Mitsubishi UFJ Trust and Banking
Mitsubishi UFJ Trust and Banking Corporation, U.S.A.
Mitsubishi UFJ Trust and Banking Corporation Scholarship Foundation

Mitsubishi UFJ Financial Group
Banks established in 2005
Banks of Japan
Mitsubishi companies
Midori-kai
Financial services companies based in Tokyo
Trust banks of Japan